Schwerbach is an Ortsgemeinde – a municipality belonging to a Verbandsgemeinde, a kind of collective municipality – in the Birkenfeld district in Rhineland-Palatinate, Germany. It belongs to the Verbandsgemeinde Herrstein-Rhaunen, whose seat is in Herrstein.

Geography

The municipality, a clump village, lies in the central Hunsrück. Between the village and the Kyrbach valley lies the Wacholderheide (“Juniper Heath”) Conservation Area.

Schwerbach is the district's smallest municipality by population.

History
In the Early Middle Ages, the Lords of Wiltberg had built a chapel in Schwerbach on the estate with which the Waldgraves were enfeoffed; it was consecrated on 15 July 1314. Schwerbach had “burial rights” at that time, which were always special rights.

In 1563, there were 12 hearths (for which read “households”) in Schwerbach.

Politics

Municipal council
The council is made up of 6 council members, who were elected by majority vote at the municipal election held on 7 June 2009, and the honorary mayor as chairwoman.

Mayor
Schwerbach's mayor is Claudia Endres.

Coat of arms
The German blazon reads: 

The municipality's arms might in English heraldic language be described thus: Per fess Or a beast with a wolf's head and an eagle's body displayed gules, its breast surmounted by a crampon palewise sable, and sable a fess argent.

The upper field is a reference to the village's former allegiance to the “Wild and Rhine” County (ruled by the Waldgraves and Rhinegraves) and shows the court seal used by those counts’ high court at Rhaunen. The lower field shows the arms formerly borne by the Lords of Wiltberg, who were the lords at Schwerbach. In 1310, they had a chapel built at Schwerbach.

Culture and sightseeing

The following are listed buildings or sites in Rhineland-Palatinate’s Directory of Cultural Monuments:
 At Dorfstraße 1 – in the commercial building a “three-naved” stable, about 1850/1860
 Dorfstraße 3 – house, partly timber-frame (slated), hipped mansard roof, about 1800

Economy and infrastructure
Schwerbach has a village community centre.

Transport
Serving nearby Kirn is a railway station on the Nahe Valley Railway (Bingen–Saarbrücken). To the north lie Bundesstraße 50 and Frankfurt-Hahn Airport.

References

External links

 
Schwerbach in the collective municipality’s webpages 

Birkenfeld (district)